Dheeran is a 1987 Indian Malayalam film, directed by K. S. Gopalakrishnan. The film stars Ratheesh, Unnimary, Bheeman Raghu and Lalithasree in the lead roles. The film has musical score by A. T. Ummer.There is another upcoming Kannada movie which will be released this December 2019 starring a BV Bhaskar and Tejaswini Prakash

Cast
Ratheesh
Unnimary
Bheeman Raghu
Lalithasree

Soundtrack
The music was composed by A. T. Ummer and the lyrics were written by Poovachal Khader.

References

External links
 

1987 films
1980s Malayalam-language films